The Stroke Count Method (simplified Chinese: 笔画; pinyin: bǐ huà), Wubihua method, Stroke input method or Bihua IME ( or ) (lit. 5-stroke input method) is a relatively simple Chinese input method for writing text on a computer or a mobile phone. It is based on the stroke order of a word, not pronunciation. It uses five or six buttons, and is often placed on a numerical keypad.  Although it is possible to input Traditional Chinese characters with this method, this method is often associated with Simplified Chinese characters.  The Wubihua method should not be confused with the Wubi method.

Each of the five keys from 1 to 5 are assigned a certain type of stroke (resembling the Eight Principles of Yong; these five are sometimes called  (héng-shù-piē-nà-zhé) with each character of this phrase being a one-syllable description of the respective five strokes:

 A horizontal stroke from left to right (一)
 A vertical stroke from top to bottom (丨)
 A long diagonal stroke downward from right to left (丿)
 A very short dash stroke downward from left to right (丶)
 A horizontal stroke from left to right, ending with a downwards hook to the left (乙)

To input any character, the user simply presses the keys corresponding to the strokes of a character then select from a list of matching characters. The list of suggestions to choose from becomes more and more specific as more digits of the code are entered. The system will not recognize a character input with an incorrect stroke order. Some people find this method of entering characters into a mobile phone to be faster than pinyin.  In fact, as pinyin is based upon Mandarin Chinese, many Chinese people – particularly in the southern regions of China like Hong Kong and Macau – who speak other varieties of Chinese and never learned pinyin relied solely on this method of entering characters on their phones, until touchscreen-based Smartphones allowed the possibility of Handwriting recognition.

Wubihua is one of the easiest to learn methods because it is simple and does not require knowledge of pronunciation or Pinyin. However, it tends to be vague, as a Wubihua code will normally match ten characters, and each character has one correct code, which confuses users whose stroke orders are wrong.

Strokes map to Wubihua input generally according to the following table:

See also
 Wubi method
 Chinese input methods for computers
 Stroke (CJK character)
 Eight principles of yong: how stroke styles are taught to student calligraphers

Notes

References

External links
 Wubihua For Speakers of English
 Thesis on chinese language processing and computing – Wubihua

Han character input